U.S. Route 95 Truck (US 95 Truck) is a truck route of US 95 in Mineral County, Nevada, in the United States. It serves as a bypass route for trucks taking US 95 past Hawthorne in either direction, as US 95 itself goes through that community. The route is co-designated as State Route 362 (SR 362); however, that designation is unsigned.

Route description
The highway begins southeast of Hawthorne and deviates from US 95 passing to the east of the city. Signs direct all trucks with Hazardous Cargo to use US 95 Truck instead of the main route. The Highway passes by the truck and cargo entrance to the Hawthorne Army Depot. The highway enters Hawthorne city limits before reaching its northern junction with US 95.

The route has been named Freedom Road by the state.

History

The bypass was proposed in the early 1980s to divert trucks carrying hazardous cargo from entering Hawthorne. Mineral County officials rejected the first two designs submitted by the Nevada Department of Transportation before accepting a third in 1982, despite reluctance from business owners over fears of lost tourist traffic.

Major intersections

See also

References

95 Truck (Hawthorne, Nevada)
95 Truck (Hawthorne)
Truck (Hawthorne, Nevada)
Transportation in Mineral County, Nevada
Hawthorne, Nevada